Na Saeng is a sub-district (tambon) in Si Wilai District, in Bueng Kan Province, northeastern Thailand. As of 2010, it had a  population of 7,920 people, with jurisdiction over nine villages.

References

Tambon of Bueng Kan province
Populated places in Bueng Kan province
Si Wilai District